"The Horses" is a song written by Rickie Lee Jones and Walter Becker. It was originally performed by Jones on her 1989 album, Flying Cowboys. While not released as a single, the original version did appear in the 1996 film Jerry Maguire and was also included on the film's soundtrack. The song was covered in 1990 by Daryl Braithwaite; his version reached  1 in Australia, and by 2022 had been certified decuple platinum.

Background and release
The song was covered by Daryl Braithwaite on his 1990 album Rise. It was released as a single on 28 January 1991 and reached No. 1 on the Australian Singles Chart in May. "The Horses" has been certified ten-times platinum in Australia by the Australian Recording Industry Association (ARIA). Margaret Urlich provided the female vocals on the recording but chose not to appear in the music video due to other work commitments. A model, Gillian Mather, lip-synced Urlich's voice for the music video.

In May 2016, while celebrating the 25th anniversary of the song peaking at No. 1 in Australia, Braithwaite said: "I would never have thought that 25 years down the track, 'The Horses' – a song that I heard quite by accident and then recorded, would be liked by so many people for so many different reasons. And for this I am eternally grateful. I am sure that Rickie Lee Jones and Walter Becker could never imagine how endearing the song would and has become."

In January 2018, as part of Triple M's "Ozzest 100", the "most Australian" songs of all time, Daryl Braithwaite's version of "The Horses" was ranked number 14.

Track listings
Australian 7-inch, CD, and cassette single
 "The Horses" − 4:16
 "I Can't Wait" − 4:12

European maxi-CD single
 "The Horses" − 4:16
 "Let Me Be" − 5:36
 "You Could Be Wrong" − 3:23
 "I Can't Wait" − 4:12

Personnel
 Daryl Braithwaite – vocals
 John Watson – drums
 Scott Griffiths – keyboards, piano
 Jef Scott – acoustic and electric guitar 
 Tommy Emmanuel – electric guitar
 Alex Pertout – shaker, sleigh bells, vibraslap, tambourine
 Jeremy Alsop – bass
 Simon Hussey – keyboards
 Margaret Urlich – backing vocals

Charts
"The Horses" made its ARIA chart debut at No. 38 on 3 March before peaking at No. 1 on 19 May. The song spent 23 weeks in the Australian top 50.

Weekly charts

Year-end charts

Certifications

See also
 List of best-selling singles in Australia

References

1991 singles
1991 songs
CBS Records singles
Number-one singles in Australia
Songs written by Rickie Lee Jones
Songs written by Walter Becker